The 2014 Federation Tournament of Champions took place at the Times Union Center in downtown Albany on March 21, 22 and 23. Federation championships were awarded in the AA, A and B classifications. Christ the King in Middle Village, Queens won the Class AA championship. Andre Walker of Christ the King was named the Class AA tournament's Most Valuable Player. Scotia-Glenville in Scotia won the Class A championship. Joe Cremo was named the Class A tournament's Most Valuable Player.

Class AA 

Participating teams, results and individual honors in Class AA were as follows:

Participating teams

Results 

Christ the King finished the season with a 25-6 record.

Individual honors 

The following players were awarded individual honors for their performances at the Federation Tournament:

Most Valuable Player 

 Andrew Walker, Christ the King

All-Tournament Team 

 Rawle Alkins, Christ the King
 Chris Atkinson, Long Island Lutheran
 Adonis De La Rosa, Christ the King
 Jamil Hood, Jr., Green Tech
 Rashoud Salnave, Cardozo

Sportsmanship Award 

 Robyn Missa, Christ the King

Class A 

Participating teams, results and individual honors in Class A were as follows:

Participating teams 

WHEELS is an acronym for Washington Heights Expeditionary Learning School.

Results 

Scotia-Glenville finished the season with a 27-0 record.

Individual honors 

The following players were awarded individual honors for their performances at the Federation Tournament:

Most Valuable Player 

 Joe Cremo, Scotia-Glenville

All-Tournament Team 

 Peter Alkins, Holy Trinity
 Ray Jerome, Albany Academy 
 Dom LeMorta, Scotia-Glenville
 Emile Lewis, WHEELS
 Alex Sausville, Scotia-Glenville

Sportsmanship Award 

 Jimmy Golaszewski, Holy Trinity

Class B 

Participating teams, results and individual honors in Class B were as follows:

Participating teams

Results 

Westhill finished the season with a 27-0 record.

Individual honors 

The following players were awarded individual honors for their performances at the Federation Tournament:

Most Valuable Player 

 Jordan Roland, Westhill

All-Tournament Team 

 Chris Benjamin, Brooklyn Community
 William Billy, Westhill
 Mike Cerone, Regis
 Pee Wee Kirkland, Dwight
 Tyler Reynolds, Westhill

Sportsmanship Award 

 Luke Passanannte, Regis

External links 

 http://www.nysbasketballbrackets.com/

References 

High school basketball competitions in the United States
High school sports in New York (state)
Sports competitions in Albany, New York
Basketball competitions in New York (state)
High
New York
New York state high school boys basketball championships